The Bicentennial Tower is an observation tower located in Erie, Pennsylvania and features panoramic views of Lake Erie, Presque Isle State Park, and downtown Erie. The tower was built to signify the city's bicentennial year 1996.
 It's located at the end of State Street on Dobbins Landing. The tower's address is 1 State St, Erie, PA 16507.

References

External links
Visitors Guide to Erie,Pa

Towers completed in 1996
Towers in Pennsylvania
Buildings and structures in Erie, Pennsylvania
Tourist attractions in Erie, Pennsylvania